is a Japanese politician serving in the House of Representatives in the Diet (national legislature) as a member of the Liberal Democratic Party. He represents the 5th District of Chiba prefecture. A native of Takamatsu, Kagawa and graduate of the University of Tokyo, he was elected for the first time in the 2005 general election after an unsuccessful run in 2003.

Honours
 : Grand Officer of the Order of Orange-Nassau (29 October 2014)

References

External links 

 Official website in Japanese.

1972 births
Living people
Politicians from Kagawa Prefecture
University of Tokyo alumni
Koizumi Children
Members of the House of Representatives (Japan)
Liberal Democratic Party (Japan) politicians
People from Takamatsu, Kagawa